The Blastocatellales is an order of Acidobacteriota within the class Blastocatellia.

Phylogeny
The currently accepted taxonomy is based on the List of Prokaryotic names with Standing in Nomenclature and the phylogeny is based on 16S rRNA sequences. Numbered orders and families do not yet have any cultured representatives.

References

Bacteria orders
Acidobacteriota